Enrique Enríquez (30 September 1701 – 25 April 1756) was an Italian Roman Catholic cardinal.

Born in Campi Salentina, in the Kingdom of Naples, he studied canon and civil law at the La Sapienza University, Rome, was later made governor of several towns until 1743, when he received the minor orders.

On 16 December 1743 he was elected titular archbishop of Nazianzo and was sent as Apostolic nuncio to Spain on 8 January 1744. Pope Benedict XIV created him cardinal priest in the consistory of 26 November 1753, with the title of Sant'Eusebio. As legate to Ravenna, he reestablished the independence of the Republic of San Marino, which his predecessor Cardinal Giulio Alberoni had suppressed.

Enriquez died in 1756 at Ravenna.

References

External links
The Cardinals of the Holy Roman Church-Biographical Dictionary
Catholic Hierarchy data for this cardinal 

1701 births
1756 deaths
People from the Province of Lecce
18th-century Italian cardinals
18th-century Italian Roman Catholic archbishops
History of San Marino